M. K. Brown is an American cartoonist and painter whose work has appeared in many publications, including National Lampoon (1972-1981), Mother Jones, Wimmen's Comix, The New Yorker, Playboy, among others. She has written several books, created animations for The Tracey Ullman Show, and was a contributing artist to the "comic jam" graphic novel The Narrative Corpse.  She is also an accomplished painter with work in galleries and many private collections.

Lynda Barry, cartoonist of the comic strip Ernie Pook's Comeek, lists Brown one of her early influences.

Personal life 
M.K. Brown was born in Connecticut and she grew up in Darien, Connecticut and New Brunswick, Canada. She attended school at Silvermine Guild School of Art (now named Silvermine Guild Arts Center) in New Canaan, Connecticut with cartoonist, Manuel "Spain" Rodriguez.

Brown was married to fellow cartoonist B. Kliban; together they had a daughter, Kalia who is a dancer and artist. Since 1967, she has lived in Fairfax, California in Marin County. Brown was married to Gunard Solberg

Dr. N!Godatu

Her animated series Dr. N!Godatu (with Julie Payne as Dr. Janice N!Godatu) debuted on April 5, 1987 on The Tracey Ullman Show, airing as the sole animated short for the first two weeks then alternating with Simpsons shorts for the rest of the first season (animated by the same Klasky Csupo team of Wesley Archer, David Silverman, & Bill Kopp). Ullman show cast members Julie Kavner and Dan Castellaneta along with then-freelance voice actress Nancy Cartwright provided voices: Kavner as her receptionist Elaine, Cartwright in "Freeway" (as Pat, Dr. N!Godatu's friend who refuses to drive on freeways, through tunnels, or over bridges), and Castellaneta in "Blind Date" (as Dr. N!Godatu's date, Bill Wallhead) and "Fishtank" (as the fish tank repairmen).  There were six shorts in all, each divided into four Acts. There were also two unreleased episodes (The Party and The Proposal).
Dr. N!Godatu (a character of Brown herself) is pronounced without a vowel sound preceding the N and a clicked G.

Episode synopsis 
1 (4W02) The Office:  Dr. N!godatu wore her pink slippers to work; not to worry, since she keeps a pair of pumps in a drawer for just such an emergency - but the drawer is filled with giggling pink slippers.
2 (4W03) Blind Date: Dr. N!godatu has a dream date with Bill Wallhead, a lawyer who's also a surgeon that previously played linebacker for the Los Angeles Rams, and in college, was voted cutest couple; unfortunately, Bill's also someone who likes to talk about himself too much.
4 (4W01) Freeway: Dr. N!godatu is going shopping with her friend Pat (voice of Nancy Cartwright), who never drives over bridges, through tunnels, or - until Act III - on the freeway.
7 (4W26) Fishtank: Dr. N!godatu's fish are doing strange things, which is nothing compared to what the two balloon-like repairmen (voice of Dan Castellaneta) are doing trying to fix it.
9 (4W09) The Dream: Dr. N!Godatu has a strange dream - and that guy in it looks like her blind date Bill...
13 (4W12) Scanner: Dr. N!Godatu breaks out a scanner that converts brain activity into a TV picture.  Ah, computer programming...
The Party: (unreleased) Pat's throwing a party.
The Proposal: (unreleased) You remember him. Bill Wallhead. He's back and he means business.

Character list 
Dr. Janice N!Godatu
Elaine (receptionist)
Mr. Marsh (patient)
Bill Wallhead (boyfriend)
Pat (friend)
The Carlisles (fishtank repairmen)
Michelle (patient)

National Lampoon magazine
M. K. Brown contributed various strips to National Lampoon magazine between 1972 until 1981; "Aunt Mary's Kitchen" featuring regularly from the early '70s into the early '80s, often in multi-page full color spreads. In 1983 Collier Books published the "Aunt Mary's Kitchen" cookbook of 140 recipes gathered by M. K. Brown.

The Magic Lamp, - June 1972
Funny Pages, "Mercury, God's Own Messenger" - July 1972
Funny Pages, "Whistle-Stop" - August 1972
Goin' West, - September 1972
Funny Pages, "Russ de la Rocca--Worm Trainer of the Americas" - September 1972
Funny Pages, "Beans Morocco Rides Again" - October 1972
Funny Pages, "Bill--The Story of a Newt Who Was Eaten by His Suit" - December 1972
The Day the Animals Discovered Death, Illustrated by M.K. Brown - January 1973
Another "True Life" Western Romance,  - March 1973
Funny Pages, "Night Ride" - May 1973
Funny Pages, "Different Story" - June 1973
Saga of the Frozen North, - October 1973
Mercury, Messenger of God, - February 1974
Editorial cartoon  - March 1974
Earl D. Porker, Social Worker, - March 1974
Western Romance, - May 1974
Funny Pages, "How to Appear Normal" and "Beans Morocco" - June 1974
Waste Not Want Nots, - July 1974
Funny Pages, "Worms" - October 1974
Earl D. Porker, Social Worker, - January 1975

"Aunt Mary's Kitchen"

Aunt Mary's - 12 panel Full COLOR spread. - August 1980
Aunt Mary's - August 1980: Aunt Mary had the strangest dream last night!
Aunt Mary's - September 1980: Aunt Mary decides to have a slide show.
Aunt Mary's - October 1980: Aunt Mary looks for pictures for the slide show.
Aunt Mary's - November 1980: Leo tries to fix the Popcorn machine.
Aunt Mary's - December 1980: Leo goes to the emergency room.
Aunt Mary's - May 1981: You know what they say about Fig Bars!
Aunt Mary's - June  1981: Leo has escaped from the hospital!
Aunt Mary's - August 1981:  Can I have just ONE bite of your hamburger?
Aunt Mary's Slide Show - 11 panel Full COLOR spread. - August 1981

Bibliography

Books authored by M.K. Brown 

 
 
 Let's Go Swimming with Mr. Sillypants - Crown, 1986

Illustrations by M.K. Brown 

Big Goof and Little Goof: A Pet for the Goofs, a Change of Seasons, Bigger and Smaller - (Illustrations)

Comic strip anthologies

Filmography

References

External links

Mark's Very Large National Lampoon site
Dr. N!Godatu show info and episode transcripts

American women cartoonists
20th-century American painters
21st-century American painters
Animators from Connecticut
Living people
American female comics artists
National Lampoon people
20th-century American women artists
21st-century American women artists
Year of birth missing (living people)
People from Fairfax, California
American cartoonists